The following is a list of players, both past and current, who have appeared in at least one regular season or playoff game for the Phoenix Suns NBA franchise.

All statistics and awards listed were during the player's tenure with the Suns only. All statistics are accurate as of the end of the 2020–21 season.



Players

A to B

|-
|align="left"| || align="center"|F/C || align="left"|Baylor || align="center"|1 || align="center"| || 10 || 123 || 25 || 8 || 17 || 12.3 || 2.5 || 0.8 || 1.7 || align=center|
|-
|align="left" bgcolor="#FFCC00"|+ (#33) || align="center"|F/C || align="left"|Oklahoma || align="center" bgcolor="#CFECEC"|13 || align="center"|– || bgcolor="#CFECEC"|988 || bgcolor="#CFECEC"|27,203 || bgcolor="#CFECEC"|6,937 || 4,012 || 13,910 || 27.5 || 7.0 || 4.1 || 14.1 || align=center|
|-
|align="left"| || align="center"|G/F || align="left"|Syracuse || align="center"|1 || align="center"| || 62 || 711 || 106 || 45 || 359 || 11.5 || 1.7 || 0.7 || 5.8 || align=center|
|-
|align="left"| || align="center"|G || align="left"|BYU || align="center"|3 || align="center"|– || 222 || 5,092 || 454 || 650 || 2,124 || 22.9 || 2.0 || 2.9 || 9.6 || align=center|
|-
|align="left"| || align="center"|G || align="left"|Creighton || align="center"|1 || align="center"| || 15 || 47 || 10 || 6 || 9 || 3.1 || 0.7 || 0.4 || 0.6 || align=center|
|-
|align="left"| || align="center"|F/C || align="left"|UNLV || align="center"|2 || align="center"|– || 155 || 2,212 || 616 || 59 || 692 || 14.3 || 4.0 || 0.4 || 4.5 || align=center|
|-
|align="left"| || align="center"|F || align="left"|California || align="center"|1 || align="center"| || 15 || 278 || 45 || 17 || 56 || 18.5 || 3.0 || 1.1 || 3.7 || align=center|
|-
|align="left"| || align="center"|F || align="left"|Illinois || align="center"|1 || align="center"| || 1 || 6 || 1 || 1 || 1 || 6.0 || 1.0 || 1.0 || 1.0 || align=center|
|-
|align="left"| || align="center"|F || align="left"|UCLA || align="center"|1 || align="center"| || 26 || 884 || 145 || 87 || 258 || 34.0 || 5.6 || 3.3 || 9.9 || align=center|
|-
|align="left"| || align="center"|C || align="left"|Santa Clara || align="center"|4 || align="center"|– || 309 || 7,596 || 1,655 || 846 || 1,873 || 24.6 || 5.4 || 2.7 || 6.1 || align=center|
|-
|align="left" bgcolor="#CCFFCC"|x || align="center"|C || align="left"|Arizona || align="center"|3 || align="center"|– || 178 || 5,534 || 1,892 || 296 || 2,846 || 31.1 || 10.6 || 1.7 || 16.0 || align=center|
|-
|align="left"| || align="center"|F/C || align="left"|Rutgers || align="center"|1 || align="center"| || 65 || 869 || 210 || 42 || 288 || 13.4 || 3.2 || 0.6 || 4.4 || align=center|
|-
|align="left"| || align="center"|G || align="left"|UCLA || align="center"|2 || align="center"|– || 73 || 698 || 126 || 43 || 241 || 9.6 || 1.7 || 0.6 || 3.3 || align=center|
|-
|align="left"| || align="center"|G || align="left"|UNLV || align="center"|2 || align="center"|– || 69 || 813 || 58 || 85 || 346 || 11.8 || 0.8 || 1.2 || 5.0 || align=center|
|-
|align="left"| || align="center"|F/C || align="left"|Saint Joseph's || align="center"|3 || align="center"|– || 165 || 4,289 || 1,095 || 325 || 1,811 || 26.0 || 6.6 || 2.0 || 11.0 || align=center|
|-
|align="left"| || align="center"|G || align="left"| Bauru Basket || align="center"|9 || align="center"|– || 553 || 13,035 || 1,239 || 1,321 || 6,443 || 23.6 || 2.2 || 2.4 || 11.7 || align=center|
|-
|align="left" bgcolor="#FFFF99"|^ (#34) || align="center"|F || align="left"|Auburn || align="center"|4 || align="center"|– || 280 || 10,171 || 3,232 || 1,219 || 6,556 || 36.3 || 11.5 || 4.4 || 23.4 || align=center|
|-
|align="left"| || align="center"|F || align="left"|UCLA || align="center"|1 || align="center"| || 77 || 2,082 || 421 || 212 || 788 || 27.0 || 5.5 || 2.8 || 10.2 || align=center|
|-
|align="left"| || align="center"|G || align="left"|Seton Hall || align="center"|1 || align="center"| || 2 || 21 || 3 || 2 || 9 || 10.5 || 1.5 || 1.0 || 4.5 || align=center|
|-
|align="left"| || align="center"|C || align="left"|Memphis || align="center"|2 || align="center"| || 28 || 326 || 68 || 9 || 68 || 11.6 || 2.4 || 0.3 || 2.4 || align=center|
|-
|align="left"| || align="center"|F || align="left"|Illinois || align="center"|2 || align="center"|– || 75 || 992 || 177 || 53 || 338 || 13.2 || 2.4 || 0.7 || 4.5 || align=center|
|-
|align="left"|x || align="center"|F/C || align="left"|Washington State || align="center"|1 || align="center"| || 42 || 934 || 237 || 67 || 481 || 22.2 || 5.6 || 1.6 || 11.5 || align=center|
|-
|align="left"| || align="center"|F || align="left"|Kansas State || align="center"|1 || align="center"| || 75 || 1,554 || 282 || 111 || 759 || 20.7 || 3.8 || 1.5 || 10.1 || align=center|
|-
|align="left"| || align="center"|C || align="left"|Memphis || align="center"|1 || align="center"| || 50 || 979 || 246 || 57 || 334 || 19.6 || 4.9 || 1.1 || 6.7 || align=center|
|-
|align="left"| || align="center"|G || align="left"|Michigan State || align="center"|1 || align="center"| || 5 || 42 || 4 || 2 || 8 || 8.4 || 0.8 || 0.4 || 1.6 || align=center|
|-
|align="left"| || align="center"|G || align="left"|FIU || align="center"|4 || align="center"|– || 254 || 9,234 || 842 || 600 || 3,406 || 36.4 || 3.3 || 2.4 || 13.4 || align=center|
|-
|align="left"| || align="center"|F || align="left"| Maccabi Tel Aviv || align="center"|3 || align="center"|– || 171 || 3,469 || 647 || 209 || 907 || 20.3 || 3.8 || 1.2 || 5.3 || align=center|
|-
|align="left"| || align="center"|F || align="left"|Arizona State || align="center"|1 || align="center"| || 19 || 230 || 49 || 6 || 85 || 12.1 || 2.6 || 0.3 || 4.5 || align=center|
|-
|align="left"| || align="center"|G || align="left"|NC State || align="center"|1 || align="center"| || 7 || 18 || 2 || 3 || 4 || 2.6 || 0.3 || 0.4 || 0.6 || align=center|
|-
|align="left"| || align="center"|G || align="left"|Kentucky || align="center"|5 || align="center"|– || 224 || 7,534 || 1,077 || 1,345 || 4,209 || 33.6 || 4.8 || 6.0 || 18.8 || align=center|
|-
|align="left"| || align="center"|F || align="left"|Cincinnati || align="center"|2 || align="center"|– || 68 || 833 || 198 || 18 || 161 || 12.3 || 2.9 || 0.3 || 2.4 || align=center|
|-
|align="left"| || align="center"|F || align="left"|UCLA || align="center"|1 || align="center"| || 3 || 33 || 8 || 0 || 6 || 11.0 || 2.7 || 0.0 || 2.0 || align=center|
|-
|align="left"| || align="center"|G || align="left"|UNLV || align="center"|1 || align="center"| || 8 || 48 || 6 || 0 || 19 || 6.0 || 0.8 || 0.0 || 2.4 || align=center|
|-
|align="left" bgcolor="#FBCEB1"|* || align="center"|G || align="left"|Kentucky || align="center"|6 || align="center"|– || 409 || 13,727 || 1,523 || 1,899 || 9,395 || 33.6 || 3.7 || 4.6 || 23.0 || align=center|
|-
|align="left"| || align="center"|G/F || align="left"|North Carolina || align="center"|1 || align="center"| || 64 || 937 || 87 || 80 || 325 || 14.6 || 1.4 || 1.3 || 5.1 || align=center|
|-
|align="left"| || align="center"|G || align="left"|Stanford || align="center"|3 || align="center"|– || 239 || 3,819 || 423 || 525 || 1,697 || 16.0 || 1.8 || 2.2 || 7.1 || align=center|
|-
|align="left" bgcolor="#CCFFCC"|x || align="center"|G || align="left"|Villanova || align="center"|3 || align="center"|– || 227 || 6,807 || 865 || 454 || 2,321 || 30.0 || 3.8 || 2.0 || 10.2 || align=center|
|-
|align="left"| || align="center"|G || align="left"|Oregon || align="center"|1 || align="center"| || 25 || 473 || 27 || 104 || 240 || 18.9 || 1.1 || 4.2 || 9.6 || align=center|
|-
|align="left"| || align="center"|F || align="left"|NC State || align="center"|1 || align="center"| || 10 || 83 || 16 || 4 || 34 || 8.3 || 1.6 || 0.4 || 3.4 || align=center|
|-
|align="left"| || align="center"|G || align="left"|Illinois || align="center"|1 || align="center"| || 2 || 28 || 1 || 3 || 5 || 14.0 || 0.5 || 1.5 || 2.5 || align=center|
|-
|align="left"| || align="center"|G || align="left"|Pepperdine || align="center"|1 || align="center"| || 33 || 236 || 22 || 31 || 80 || 7.2 || 0.7 || 0.9 || 2.4 || align=center|
|-
|align="left"| || align="center"|G || align="left"|NC State || align="center"|1 || align="center"| || 8 || 61 || 7 || 11 || 20 || 7.6 || 0.9 || 1.4 || 2.5 || align=center|
|-
|align="left"| || align="center"|F/C || align="left"|George Washington || align="center"|1 || align="center"| || 6 || 83 || 25 || 5 || 16 || 13.8 || 4.2 || 0.8 || 2.7 || align=center|
|-
|align="left"| || align="center"|G || align="left"|New Mexico State || align="center"|1 || align="center"| || 32 || 262 || 26 || 35 || 41 || 8.2 || 0.8 || 1.1 || 1.3 || align=center|
|-
|align="left"| || align="center"|G || align="left"|Michigan State || align="center"|2 || align="center"|– || 118 || 2,802 || 306 || 177 || 1,267 || 23.7 || 2.6 || 1.5 || 10.7 || align=center|
|-
|align="left"| || align="center"|F/C || align="left"|Seton Hall || align="center"|2 || align="center"|– || 111 || 2,128 || 456 || 93 || 671 || 19.2 || 4.1 || 0.8 || 6.0 || align=center|
|-
|align="left"| || align="center"|F || align="left"|Arizona || align="center"|1 || align="center"| || 17 || 200 || 29 || 15 || 55 || 11.8 || 1.7 || 0.9 || 3.2 || align=center|
|-
|align="left"| || align="center"|G/F || align="left"|Arizona || align="center"|1 || align="center"| || 6 || 54 || 8 || 3 || 6 || 9.0 || 1.3 || 0.5 || 1.0 || align=center|
|-
|align="left"| || align="center"|G/F || align="left"|North Carolina || align="center"|1 || align="center"| || 11 || 75 || 10 || 2 || 4 || 6.8 || 0.9 || 0.2 || 0.4 || align=center|
|-
|align="left"| || align="center"|F/C || align="left"|Auburn || align="center"|2 || align="center"|– || 65 || 510 || 120 || 21 || 201 || 7.8 || 1.8 || 0.3 || 3.1 || align=center|
|-
|align="left"| || align="center"|G || align="left"|Iona || align="center"|1 || align="center"| || 31 || 356 || 34 || 59 || 187 || 11.5 || 1.1 || 1.9 || 6.0 || align=center|
|-
|align="left"| || align="center"|G || align="left"|Evansville || align="center"|3 || align="center"|– || 245 || 7,590 || 699 || 1,067 || 1,952 || 31.0 || 2.9 || 4.4 || 8.0 || align=center|
|-
|align="left"| || align="center"|F || align="left"|Syracuse || align="center"|1 || align="center"| || 43 || 734 || 97 || 61 || 291 || 17.1 || 2.3 || 1.4 || 6.8 || align=center|
|}

C

|-
|align="left"| || align="center"|F || align="left"| Budućnost || align="center"|2 || align="center"|– || 52 || 581 || 102 || 40 || 212 || 11.2 || 2.0 || 0.8 || 4.1 || align=center|
|-
|align="left"| || align="center"|F || align="left"|Penn || align="center"|3 || align="center"|– || 172 || 4,340 || 778 || 215 || 1,165 || 25.2 || 4.5 || 1.3 || 6.8 || align=center|
|-
|align="left"| || align="center"|G || align="left"|Murray State || align="center"|2 || align="center"|– || 38 || 921 || 93 || 138 || 314 || 24.2 || 2.4 || 3.6 || 8.3 || align=center|
|-
|align="left"| || align="center"|G || align="left"|Southern Illinois || align="center"|1 || align="center"| || 60 || 590 || 102 || 43 || 240 || 9.8 || 1.7 || 0.7 || 4.0 || align=center|
|-
|align="left"| || align="center"|F/C || align="left"|Purdue || align="center"|1 || align="center"| || 11 || 96 || 24 || 11 || 37 || 8.7 || 2.2 || 1.0 || 3.4 || align=center|
|-
|align="left"|x || align="center"|G || align="left"|West Virginia || align="center"|1 || align="center"|– || 118 || 1,662 || 210 || 155 || 535 || 14.1 || 1.8 || 1.3 || 4.5 || align=center|
|-
|align="left"| || align="center"|G/F || align="left"|North Carolina || align="center"|1 || align="center"| || 51 || 1,387 || 185 || 82 || 689 || 27.2 || 3.6 || 1.6 || 13.5 || align=center|
|-
|align="left"| || align="center"|G || align="left"|Florida State || align="center"|1 || align="center"| || 22 || 539 || 50 || 99 || 325 || 24.5 || 2.3 || 4.5 || 14.8 || align=center|
|-
|align="left"| || align="center"|F || align="left"|Cal State Fullerton || align="center"|6 || align="center"|––  || 331 || 6,437 || 1,480 || 337 || 3,916 || 19.4 || 4.5 || 1.0 || 11.8 || align=center|
|-
|align="left"| || align="center"|F || align="left"|North Carolina || align="center"|1 || align="center"| || 28 || 367 || 80 || 37 || 153 || 13.1 || 2.9 || 1.3 || 5.5 || align=center|
|-
|align="left"| || align="center"|F || align="left"|Utah || align="center"|1 || align="center"| || 79 || 1,139 || 219 || 54 || 657 || 14.4 || 2.8 || 0.7 || 8.3 || align=center|
|-
|align="left" bgcolor="#FFCC00"|+ (#24) || align="center"|F/C || align="left"|Utah || align="center"|5 || align="center"|– || 380 || 12,194 || 2,491 || 858 || 7,817 || 32.1 || 6.6 || 2.3 || 20.6 || align=center|
|-
|align="left"| || align="center"|C || align="left"|Dominguez HS (CA) || align="center"|4 || align="center"|– || 166 || 4,156 || 1,572 || 153 || 1,195 || 25.0 || 9.5 || 0.9 || 7.2 || align=center|
|-
|align="left"| || align="center"|G || align="left"|Kentucky || align="center"|4 || align="center"|– || 224 || 6,236 || 538 || 556 || 2,787 || 27.8 || 2.4 || 2.5 || 12.4 || align=center|
|-
|align="left"| || align="center"|G/F || align="left"|Stanford || align="center"|2 || align="center"|– || 88 || 1,385 || 250 || 76 || 372 || 15.7 || 2.8 || 0.9 || 4.2 || align=center|
|-
|align="left"| || align="center"|F || align="left"|Washington || align="center"|2 || align="center"|– || 154 || 3,270 || 743 || 143 || 1,309 || 21.2 || 4.8 || 0.9 || 8.5 || align=center|
|-
|align="left"| || align="center"|C || align="left"|Grambling State || align="center"|1 || align="center"| || 81 || 1,244 || 339 || 98 || 386 || 15.4 || 4.2 || 1.2 || 4.8 || align=center|
|-
|align="left"| || align="center"|G || align="left"|Temple || align="center"|1 || align="center"| || 31 || 198 || 38 || 8 || 71 || 6.4 || 1.2 || 0.3 || 2.3 || align=center|
|-
|align="left"| || align="center"|F || align="left"|Louisville || align="center"|2 || align="center"|– || 60 || 455 || 79 || 25 || 169 || 7.6 || 1.3 || 0.4 || 2.8 || align=center|
|-
|align="left"| || align="center"|C || align="left"|Boise State || align="center"|1 || align="center"| || 5 || 11 || 2 || 1 || 8 || 2.2 || 0.4 || 0.2 || 1.6 || align=center|
|-
|align="left"| || align="center"|F/C || align="left"|Stanford || align="center"|1 || align="center"| || 34 || 261 || 62 || 6 || 34 || 7.7 || 1.8 || 0.2 || 1.0 || align=center|
|-
|align="left"| || align="center"|F/C || align="left"|Idaho State || align="center"|5 || align="center"|– || 299 || 5,304 || 1,244 || 457 || 1,639 || 17.7 || 4.2 || 1.5 || 5.5 || align=center|
|-
|align="left"| || align="center"|G || align="left"|USC || align="center"|1 || align="center"| || 23 || 136 || 9 || 28 || 48 || 5.9 || 0.4 || 1.2 || 2.1 || align=center|
|-
|align="left"| || align="center"|G/F || align="left"|DePaul || align="center"|2 || align="center"|– || 107 || 2,246 || 528 || 177 || 863 || 21.0 || 4.9 || 1.7 || 8.1 || align=center|
|-
|align="left"| || align="center"|G || align="left"|Providence || align="center"|1 || align="center"| || 3 || 33 || 0 || 3 || 4 || 11.0 || 0.0 || 1.0 || 1.3 || align=center|
|-
|align="left"| || align="center"|F/C || align="left"|Oregon State || align="center"|2 || align="center"|– || 156 || 2,575 || 760 || 232 || 1,274 || 16.5 || 4.9 || 1.5 || 8.2 || align=center|
|-
|align="left"| || align="center"|F || align="left"|Southern Miss || align="center"|1 || align="center"| || 33 || 168 || 27 || 9 || 103 || 5.1 || 0.8 || 0.3 || 3.1 || align=center|
|-
|align="left"| || align="center"|G/F || align="left"|USC Upstate || align="center"|1 || align="center"| || 32 || 602 || 154 || 33 || 229 || 18.8 || 4.8 || 1.0 || 7.2 || align=center|
|-
|align="left"| || align="center"|G || align="left"|Michigan || align="center"|1 || align="center"| || 64 || 1,211 || 85 || 229 || 508 || 18.9 || 1.3 || 3.6 || 7.9 || align=center|
|-
|align="left"| || align="center"|G || align="left"|Penn State || align="center"|1 || align="center"| || 15 || 129 || 10 || 24 || 69 || 8.6 || 0.7 || 1.6 || 4.6 || align=center|
|-
|align="left"| || align="center"|F || align="left"|Texas A&M || align="center"|2 || align="center"|– || 31 || 264 || 65 || 15 || 87 || 8.5 || 2.1 || 0.5 || 2.8 || align=center|
|-
|align="left"| || align="center"|F || align="left"|Marquette || align="center"|1 || align="center"| || 60 || 1,648 || 282 || 127 || 603 || 27.5 || 4.7 || 2.1 || 10.1 || align=center|
|-
|align="left"| || align="center"|G || align="left"|Duke || align="center"|1 || align="center"| || 2 || 8 || 2 || 1 || 0 || 4.0 || 1.0 || 0.5 || 0.0 || align=center|
|}

D to E

|-
|align="left"| || align="center"|G || align="left"|VCU || align="center"|2 || align="center"|– || 130 || 2,382 || 200 || 74 || 1,021 || 18.3 || 1.5 || 0.6 || 7.9 || align=center|
|-
|align="left"| || align="center"|F || align="left"|Arizona || align="center"|2 || align="center"| || 25 || 120 || 36 || 2 || 33 || 4.8 || 1.4 || 0.1 || 1.3 || align=center|
|-
|align="left"| || align="center"|F || align="left"|Wyoming || align="center"|1 || align="center"| || 1 || 5 || 1 || 0 || 4 || 5.0 || 1.0 || 0.0 || 4.0 || align=center|
|-
|align="left"| || align="center"|G/F || align="left"|Old Dominion || align="center"|1 || align="center"| || 2 || 7 || 1 || 0 || 4 || 3.5 || 0.5 || 0.0 || 2.0 || align=center|
|-
|align="left" bgcolor="#FFCC00"|+ (#6) || align="center"|G/F || align="left"|North Carolina || align="center"|11 || align="center"|– || 766 || 23,143 || 2,472 || 3,340 || bgcolor="#CFECEC"|15,666 || 30.2 || 3.2 || 4.4 || 20.5 || align=center|
|-
|align="left"| || align="center"|G/F || align="left"|Arkansas || align="center"|1 || align="center"| || 58 || 941 || 129 || 65 || 396 || 16.2 || 2.2 || 1.1 || 6.8 || align=center|
|-
|align="left"| || align="center"|G || align="left"|NC State || align="center"|2 || align="center"|– || 38 || 532 || 51 || 66 || 179 || 14.0 || 1.3 || 1.7 || 4.7 || align=center|
|-
|align="left"| || align="center"|G || align="left"|Kentucky || align="center"|2 || align="center"|– || 123 || 3,165 || 385 || 241 || 1,440 || 25.7 || 3.1 || 2.0 || 11.7 || align=center|
|-
|align="left" bgcolor="#CCFFCC"|x || align="center"|F/C || align="left"|Kansas || align="center"|1 || align="center"| || 47 || 479 || 131 || 22 || 219 || 10.2 || 2.8 || 0.5 || 4.7 || align=center|
|-
|align="left"| || align="center"|F/C || align="left"| Élan Béarnais || align="center"|4 || align="center"|– || 258 || 7,988 || 1,337 || 1,218 || 2,697 || 31.0 || 5.2 || 4.7 || 10.5 || align=center|
|-
|align="left"| || align="center"|G || align="left"|Virginia Tech || align="center"|1 || align="center"| || 24 || 292 || 20 || 51 || 121 || 12.2 || 0.8 || 2.1 || 5.0 || align=center|
|-
|align="left"| || align="center"|G || align="left"| Olimpija || align="center"|6 || align="center"|–– || 388 || 10,010 || 1,028 || 1,728 || 4,753 || 25.8 || 2.6 || 4.5 || 12.3 || align=center|
|-
|align="left"| || align="center"|G/F || align="left"| Krka || align="center"|1 || align="center"| || 6 || 13 || 3 || 1 || 6 || 2.2 || 0.5 || 0.2 || 1.0 || align=center|
|-
|align="left"| || align="center"|C || align="left"|Yale || align="center"|1 || align="center"| || 53 || 613 || 183 || 18 || 72 || 11.6 || 3.5 || 0.3 || 1.4 || align=center|
|-
|align="left"| || align="center"|G/F || align="left"|Boston College || align="center"|7 || align="center"|–– || 468 || 11,097 || 1,610 || 774 || 4,075 || 23.7 || 3.4 || 1.7 || 8.7 || align=center|
|-
|align="left"| || align="center"|F || align="left"|Oklahoma State || align="center"|2 || align="center"| || 63 || 1,487 || 252 || 67 || 839 || 23.6 || 4.0 || 1.1 || 13.3 || align=center|
|-
|align="left"| || align="center"|G || align="left"|Kansas City || align="center"|1 || align="center"| || 6 || 51 || 2 || 3 || 14 || 8.5 || 0.3 || 0.5 || 2.3 || align=center|
|-
|align="left"| || align="center"|G/F || align="left"|Alabama || align="center"|1 || align="center"| || 34 || 321 || 60 || 25 || 33 || 9.4 || 1.8 || 0.7 || 1.0 || align=center|
|-
|align="left"| || align="center"|F || align="left"|BYU || align="center"|1 || align="center"| || 4 || 51 || 8 || 5 || 17 || 12.8 || 2.0 || 1.3 || 4.3 || align=center|
|-
|align="left"| || align="center"|F || align="left"|Long Beach State || align="center"|1 || align="center"| || 32 || 103 || 12 || 15 || 43 || 3.2 || 0.4 || 0.5 || 1.3 || align=center|
|-
|align="left"| || align="center"|G/F || align="left"|Virginia Tech || align="center"|1 || align="center"| || 5 || 62 || 7 || 0 || 24 || 12.4 || 1.4 || 0.0 || 4.8 || align=center|
|-
|align="left"| || align="center"|F/C || align="left"|Washington || align="center"|6 || align="center"|– || 267 || 6,964 || 1,490 || 530 || 3,933 || 26.1 || 5.6 || 2.0 || 14.7 || align=center|
|-
|align="left"| || align="center"|G || align="left"|Boston College || align="center"|1 || align="center"| || 34 || 727 || 63 || 117 || 240 || 21.4 || 1.9 || 3.4 || 7.1 || align=center|
|-
|align="left"| || align="center"|G/F || align="left"|American International || align="center"|1 || align="center"| || 68 || 1,506 || 155 || 131 || 299 || 22.1 || 2.3 || 1.9 || 4.4 || align=center|
|-
|align="left"| || align="center"|F || align="left"|UTEP || align="center"|1 || align="center"| || 29 || 196 || 44 || 15 || 93 || 6.8 || 1.5 || 0.5 || 3.2 || align=center|
|-
|align="left"| || align="center"|G || align="left"|Syracuse || align="center"|1 || align="center"| || 8 || 58 || 7 || 14 || 22 || 7.3 || 0.9 || 1.8 || 2.8 || align=center|
|-
|align="left"| || align="center"|G/F || align="left"|UCLA || align="center"|4 || align="center"|– || 239 || 6,301 || 1,133 || 664 || 2,632 || 26.4 || 4.7 || 2.8 || 11.0 || align=center|
|-
|align="left"| || align="center"|G || align="left"|Oklahoma State || align="center"|1 || align="center"| || 7 || 64 || 12 || 10 || 6 || 9.1 || 1.7 || 1.4 || 0.9 || align=center|
|}

F to G

|-
|align="left"| || align="center"|G || align="left"|Vanderbilt || align="center"|1 || align="center"| || 48 || 487 || 74 || 36 || 248 || 10.1 || 1.5 || 0.8 || 5.2 || align=center|
|-
|align="left"| || align="center"|G/F || align="left"|Wisconsin || align="center"|2 || align="center"|– || 109 || 4,008 || 494 || 357 || 1,585 || 36.8 || 4.5 || 3.3 || 14.5 || align=center|
|-
|align="left"| || align="center"|F || align="left"|Houston || align="center"|2 || align="center"|– || 64 || 483 || 113 || 8 || 171 || 7.5 || 1.8 || 0.1 || 2.7 || align=center|
|-
|align="left"| || align="center"|F || align="left"|Clemson || align="center"|1 || align="center"| || 3 || 13 || 3 || 0 || 4 || 4.3 || 1.0 || 0.0 || 1.3 || align=center|
|-
|align="left"| || align="center"|C || align="left"|Grand Canyon || align="center"|2 || align="center"|– || 139 || 2,130 || 565 || 296 || 569 || 15.3 || 4.1 || 2.1 || 4.1 || align=center|
|-
|align="left"| || align="center"|G || align="left"|UCLA || align="center"|3 || align="center"|– || 207 || 3,446 || 258 || 479 || 1,562 || 16.6 || 1.2 || 2.3 || 7.5 || align=center|
|-
|align="left"| || align="center"|F/C || align="left"|South Carolina || align="center"|2 || align="center"|– || 132 || 4,020 || 1,249 || 236 || 1,747 || 30.5 || 9.5 || 1.8 || 13.2 || align=center|
|-
|align="left"| || align="center"|G || align="left"|BYU || align="center"|1 || align="center"| || 6 || 65 || 7 || 8 || 22 || 10.8 || 1.2 || 1.3 || 3.7 || align=center|
|-
|align="left"| || align="center"|F/C || align="left"|Arizona || align="center"|4 || align="center"|– || 304 || 8,712 || 1,735 || 395 || 3,464 || 28.7 || 5.7 || 1.3 || 11.4 || align=center|
|-
|align="left"| || align="center"|G || align="left"|Saint Joseph's || align="center"|1 || align="center"| || 40 || 438 || 42 || 26 || 190 || 11.0 || 1.1 || 0.7 || 4.8 || align=center|
|-
|align="left"| || align="center"|F || align="left"|Providence || align="center"|1 || align="center"| || 10 || 62 || 22 || 4 || 16 || 6.2 || 2.2 || 0.4 || 1.6 || align=center|
|-
|align="left"| || align="center"|G || align="left"|Iowa State || align="center"|1 || align="center"| || 19 || 149 || 15 || 31 || 40 || 7.8 || 0.8 || 1.6 || 2.1 || align=center|
|-
|align="left"| || align="center"|F || align="left"|Notre Dame || align="center"|1 || align="center"| || 39 || 538 || 75 || 18 || 217 || 13.8 || 1.9 || 0.5 || 5.6 || align=center|
|-
|align="left"| || align="center"|F/C || align="left"|Old Dominion || align="center"|2 || align="center"| || 79 || 1,113 || 271 || 36 || 405 || 14.1 || 3.4 || 0.5 || 5.1 || align=center|
|-
|align="left"| || align="center"|F/C || align="left"|UNLV || align="center"|3 || align="center"|– || 145 || 4,194 || 1,045 || 132 || 2,134 || 28.9 || 7.2 || 0.9 || 14.7 || align=center|
|-
|align="left"| || align="center"|G/F || align="left"| Cibona || align="center"|1 || align="center"| || 22 || 442 || 51 || 35 || 193 || 20.1 || 2.3 || 1.6 || 8.8 || align=center|
|-
|align="left"| || align="center"|F || align="left"| Cherno More Port Varna || align="center"|1 || align="center"| || 49 || 772 || 163 || 32 || 239 || 15.8 || 3.3 || 0.7 || 4.9 || align=center|
|-
|align="left"| || align="center"|G || align="left"|Pepperdine || align="center"|1 || align="center"| || 64 || 836 || 110 || 81 || 349 || 13.1 || 1.7 || 1.3 || 5.5 || align=center|
|-
|align="left" bgcolor="#FFFF99"|^ || align="center"|G || align="left"|UCLA || align="center"|2 || align="center"|– || 162 || 6,470 || 777 || 1,123 || 3,555 || bgcolor="#CFECEC"|39.9 || 4.8 || 6.9 || 21.9 || align=center|
|-
|align="left"| || align="center"|G || align="left"|Kentucky || align="center"|3 || align="center"|– || 150 || 2,182 || 303 || 182 || 930 || 14.5 || 2.0 || 1.2 || 6.2 || align=center|
|-
|align="left"| || align="center"|F/C || align="left"| RheinStars Köln || align="center"|3 || align="center"|– || 182 || 5,626 || 1,688 || 187 || 2,414 || 30.9 || 9.3 || 1.0 || 13.3 || align=center|
|-
|align="left"| || align="center"|F || align="left"|Xavier || align="center"|1 || align="center"| || 21 || 248 || 57 || 7 || 61 || 11.8 || 2.7 || 0.3 || 2.9 || align=center|
|-
|align="left"| || align="center"|G || align="left"|TCNJ || align="center"|1 || align="center"| || 67 || 678 || 59 || 168 || 208 || 10.1 || 0.9 || 2.5 || 3.1 || align=center|
|-
|align="left"| || align="center"|G || align="left"|LSU || align="center"|1 || align="center"| || 5 || 86 || 10 || 12 || 32 || 17.2 || 2.0 || 2.4 || 6.4 || align=center|
|-
|align="left"| || align="center"|F/C || align="left"|Oregon State || align="center"|4 || align="center"|– || 273 || 8,173 || 2,114 || 353 || 2,885 || 29.9 || 7.7 || 1.3 || 10.6 || align=center|
|-
|align="left"| || align="center"|G/F || align="left"|Gulf Shores Academy (TX) || align="center"|2 || align="center"|– || 156 || 3,776 || 461 || 213 || 2,179 || 24.2 || 3.0 || 1.4 || 14.0 || align=center|
|-
|align="left"| || align="center"|F/C || align="left"|Morehead State || align="center"|5 || align="center"|– || 345 || 6,168 || 2,186 || 247 || 1,806 || 17.9 || 6.3 || 0.7 || 5.2 || align=center|
|-
|align="left"| || align="center"|F/C || align="left"|South Carolina || align="center"|1 || align="center"| || 80 || 2,182 || 711 || 96 || 885 || 27.3 || 8.9 || 1.2 || 11.1 || align=center|
|-
|align="left"| || align="center"|F || align="left"|Idaho State || align="center"|1 || align="center"| || 36 || 422 || 103 || 24 || 145 || 11.7 || 2.9 || 0.7 || 4.0 || align=center|
|-
|align="left"| || align="center"|F || align="left"|Oklahoma || align="center"|1 || align="center"| || 8 || 32 || 2 || 1 || 10 || 4.0 || 0.3 || 0.1 || 1.3 || align=center|
|-
|align="left"| || align="center"|F || align="left"|NC State || align="center"|6 || align="center"|– || 255 || 6,369 || 1,438 || 429 || 2,311 || 25.0 || 5.6 || 1.7 || 9.1 || align=center|
|}

H

|-
|align="left"| || align="center"|C || align="left"| Paykan Tehran || align="center"|1 || align="center"| || 17 || 235 || 87 || 8 || 69 || 13.8 || 5.1 || 0.5 || 4.1 || align=center|
|-
|align="left"| || align="center"|G/F || align="left"|Memphis || align="center"|5 || align="center"|– || 236 || 7,480 || 1,071 || 986 || 2,924 || 31.7 || 4.5 || 4.2 || 12.4 || align=center|
|-
|align="left" bgcolor="#CCFFCC"|x || align="center"|G || align="left"|Auburn || align="center"|1 || align="center"| || 3 || 8 || 0 || 0 || 2 || 2.7 || 0.0 || 0.0 || 0.7 || align=center|
|-
|align="left"| || align="center"|G || align="left"|Stanford || align="center"|3 || align="center"|– || 153 || 2,472 || 255 || 361 || 1,118 || 16.2 || 1.7 || 2.4 || 7.3 || align=center|
|-
|align="left"| || align="center"|G || align="left"|Tulsa || align="center"|1 || align="center"| || 23 || 384 || 61 || 55 || 152 || 16.7 || 2.7 || 2.4 || 6.6 || align=center|
|-
|align="left"| || align="center"|F || align="left"|Florida || align="center"|1 || align="center"| || 36 || 438 || 92 || 13 || 141 || 12.2 || 2.6 || 0.4 || 3.9 || align=center|
|-
|align="left"| || align="center"|G || align="left"|Western Kentucky || align="center"|4 || align="center"|– || 319 || 8,620 || 989 || 1,135 || 4,407 || 27.0 || 3.1 || 3.6 || 13.8 || align=center|
|-
|align="left" bgcolor="#FFFF99"|^ (#42) || align="center"|F/C || align="left"|Iowa || align="center"|5 || align="center"|– || 311 || 11,763 || 2,806 || 1,341 || 6,368 || 37.8 || 9.0 || 4.3 || 20.5 || align=center|
|-
|align="left"| || align="center"|G || align="left"|Southern Illinois || align="center"|2 || align="center"|– || 129 || 1,762 || 301 || 85 || 776 || 13.7 || 2.3 || 0.7 || 6.0 || align=center|
|-
|align="left"| || align="center"|F || align="left"|Oklahoma || align="center"|5 || align="center"|– || 307 || 7,298 || 2,181 || 442 || 2,313 || 23.8 || 7.1 || 1.4 || 7.5 || align=center|
|-
|align="left"| || align="center"|G || align="left"|Oklahoma || align="center"|1 || align="center"| || 4 || 15 || 2 || 4 || 4 || 3.8 || 0.5 || 1.0 || 1.0 || align=center|
|-
|align="left"| || align="center"|G || align="left"|Nevada || align="center"|4 || align="center"|–– || 274 || 4,538 || 617 || 525 || 1,396 || 16.6 || 2.3 || 1.9 || 5.1 || align=center|
|-
|align="left" bgcolor="#FFFF99"|^ || align="center"|G/F || align="left"|Duke || align="center"|5 || align="center"|– || 362 || 10,884 || 1,712 || 889 || 4,371 || 30.1 || 4.7 || 2.5 || 12.1 || align=center|
|-
|align="left"| || align="center"|G || align="left"|Long Beach State || align="center"|2 || align="center"|– || 33 || 554 || 37 || 52 || 271 || 16.8 || 1.1 || 1.6 || 8.2 || align=center|
|-
|align="left"| || align="center"|F/C || align="left"|Bowling Green || align="center"|1 || align="center"| || 70 || 1,184 || 331 || 60 || 572 || 16.9 || 4.7 || 0.9 || 8.2 || align=center|
|-
|align="left"| || align="center"|G || align="left"|UCLA || align="center"|2 || align="center"|– || 78 || 1,826 || 135 || 205 || 636 || 23.4 || 1.7 || 2.6 || 8.2 || align=center|
|-
|align="left" bgcolor="#FFCC00"|+ || align="center"|G || align="left"|Iowa State || align="center"|6 || align="center"|– || 468 || 14,380 || 1,753 || 2,523 || 6,420 || 30.7 || 3.7 || 5.4 || 13.7 || align=center|
|-
|align="left"| || align="center"|F || align="left"|Alabama || align="center"|1 || align="center"| || 32 || 719 || 119 || 54 || 220 || 22.5 || 3.7 || 1.7 || 6.9 || align=center|
|-
|align="left"| || align="center"|G || align="left"|Texas A&M || align="center"|1 || align="center"| || 23 || 403 || 76 || 25 || 152 || 17.5 || 3.3 || 1.1 || 6.6 || align=center|
|-
|align="left"| || align="center"|G || align="left"|Arizona State || align="center"|1 || align="center"| || 81 || 1,421 || 132 || 148 || 796 || 17.5 || 1.6 || 1.8 || 9.8 || align=center|
|-
|align="left"| || align="center"|F/C || align="left"|New Mexico || align="center"|1 || align="center"| || 44 || 426 || 119 || 26 || 173 || 9.7 || 2.7 || 0.6 || 3.9 || align=center|
|-
|align="left"| || align="center"|G || align="left"|Colorado || align="center"|4 || align="center"|– || 294 || 8,931 || 835 || 1,862 || 3,165 || 30.4 || 2.8 || 6.3 || 10.8 || align=center|
|-
|align="left"| || align="center"|F/C || align="left"|Minnesota || align="center"|1 || align="center"| || 4 || 74 || 32 || 7 || 29 || 18.5 || 8.0 || 1.8 || 7.3 || align=center|
|-
|align="left"| || align="center"|C || align="left"|DePaul || align="center"|1 || align="center"| || 76 || 1,046 || 227 || 13 || 348 || 13.8 || 3.0 || 0.2 || 4.6 || align=center|
|}

J

|-
|align="left"| || align="center"|G || align="left"|Guilford || align="center"|1 || align="center"| || 44 || 775 || 67 || 93 || 174 || 17.6 || 1.5 || 2.1 || 4.0 || align=center|
|-
|align="left"| || align="center"|G || align="left"|Ohio State || align="center"|2 || align="center"|– || 67 || 1,417 || 218 || 128 || 451 || 21.1 || 3.3 || 1.9 || 6.7 || align=center|
|-
|align="left"| || align="center"|G/F || align="left"|Kansas || align="center"|2 || align="center"|– || 156 || 3,947 || 698 || 302 || 1,922 || 25.3 || 4.5 || 1.9 || 12.3 || align=center|
|-
|align="left"| || align="center"|G/F || align="left"|Stanford || align="center"|3 || align="center"|– || 190 || 3,743 || 351 || 208 || 1,046 || 19.7 || 1.8 || 1.1 || 5.5 || align=center|
|-
|align="left"| || align="center"|G || align="left"|Lamar || align="center"|1 || align="center"| || 32 || 669 || 89 || 120 || 332 || 20.9 || 2.8 || 3.8 || 10.4 || align=center|
|-
|align="left"| || align="center"|F || align="left"|Baylor || align="center"|1 || align="center"| || 8 || 50 || 16 || 0 || 22 || 6.3 || 2.0 || 0.0 || 2.8 || align=center|
|-
|align="left"| || align="center"|G || align="left"|Vanderbilt || align="center"|2 || align="center"|– || 26 || 300 || 36 || 27 || 116 || 11.5 || 1.4 || 1.0 || 4.5 || align=center|
|-
|align="left" bgcolor="#CCFFCC"|x || align="center"|G || align="left"|Virginia || align="center"|1 || align="center"| || 31 || 328 || 46 || 44 || 102 || 10.6 || 1.5 || 1.4 || 3.3 || align=center|
|-
|align="left" bgcolor="#CCFFCC"|x || align="center"|G/F || align="left"|North Carolina || align="center"|2 || align="center"|– || 117 || 2,692 || 386 || 155 || 1077 || 23.0 || 3.3 || 1.3 || 9.2 || align=center|
|-
|align="left" bgcolor="#FFFF99"|^ || align="center"|G || align="left"|Pepperdine || align="center"|3 || align="center"|– || 236 || 8,103 || 1,108 || 1,048 || 4,140 || 34.3 || 4.7 || 4.4 || 17.5 || align=center|
|-
|align="left"| || align="center"|G/F || align="left"|Illinois || align="center"|4 || align="center"|– || 222 || 6,343 || 916 || 466 || 4,081 || 28.6 || 4.1 || 2.1 || 18.4 || align=center|
|-
|align="left"| || align="center"|G || align="left"|Wake Forest || align="center"|2 || align="center"|– || 147 || 1,997 || 195 || 334 || 656 || 13.6 || 1.3 || 2.3 || 4.5 || align=center|
|-
|align="left" bgcolor="#FFFF99"|^ || align="center"|F/C || align="left"|Idaho || align="center"|1 || align="center"| || 21 || 417 || 136 || 31 || 163 || 19.9 || 6.5 || 1.5 || 7.8 || align=center|
|-
|align="left"| || align="center"|G/F || align="left"|Arkansas || align="center"|4 || align="center"|– || 275 || 9,739 || 1,189 || 968 || 3,847 || 35.4 || 4.3 || 3.5 || 14.0 || align=center|
|-
|align="left" bgcolor="#FFCC00"|+ (#7) || align="center"|G || align="left"|California || align="center"|12 || align="center"|– || 683 || 24,018 || 2,332 || 6,518 || 12,747 || 35.2 || 3.4 || 9.5 || 18.7 || align=center|
|-
|align="left"| || align="center"|F || align="left"|Tulane || align="center"|1 || align="center"| || 6 || 53 || 13 || 3 || 15 || 8.8 || 2.2 || 0.5 || 2.5 || align=center|
|-
|align="left"| || align="center"|F/C || align="left"|Creighton || align="center"|2 || align="center"|– || 108 || 1,455 || 443 || 146 || 512 || 13.5 || 4.1 || 1.4 || 4.7 || align=center|
|-
|align="left"| || align="center"|G || align="left"|UC Santa Barbara || align="center"|1 || align="center"| || 2 || 47 || 9 || 0 || 16 || 23.5 || 4.5 || 0.0 || 8.0 || align=center|
|-
|align="left"| || align="center"|G || align="left"|Fresno State || align="center"|2 || align="center"|– || 44 || 921 || 104 || 104 || 322 || 20.9 || 2.4 || 2.4 || 7.3 || align=center|
|-
|align="left"| || align="center"|G/F || align="left"|Syracuse || align="center"|1 || align="center"| || 50 || 953 || 123 || 34 || 399 || 19.1 || 2.5 || 0.7 || 8.0 || align=center|
|-
|align="left"| || align="center"|F || align="left"|Louisville || align="center"|2 || align="center"|– || 121 || 2,307 || 587 || 180 || 854 || 19.1 || 4.9 || 1.5 || 7.1 || align=center|
|-
|align="left"| || align="center"|C || align="left"|Vanderbilt || align="center"|1 || align="center"| || 14 || 94 || 18 || 4 || 22 || 6.7 || 1.3 || 0.3 || 1.6 || align=center|
|-
|align="left"| || align="center"|F || align="left"|UNLV || align="center"|2 || align="center"|– || 38 || 578 || 83 || 15 || 177 || 15.2 || 2.2 || 0.4 || 4.7 || align=center|
|-
|align="left"| || align="center"|F/C || align="left"|Saint Joseph's || align="center"|1 || align="center"| || 2 || 7 || 2 || 0 || 0 || 3.5 || 1.0 || 0.0 || 0.0 || align=center|
|-
|align="left"| || align="center"|G/F || align="left"|Miami (FL) || align="center"|2 || align="center"|– || 151 || 3,148 || 429 || 102 || 1,184 || 20.8 || 2.8 || 0.7 || 7.8 || align=center|
|-
|align="left"| || align="center"|F || align="left"|Georgia || align="center"|1 || align="center"| || 18 || 138 || 23 || 1 || 40 || 7.7 || 1.3 || 0.1 || 2.2 || align=center|
|}

K to L

|-
|align="left" bgcolor="#CCFFCC"|x || align="center"|F/C || align="left"|Wisconsin || align="center"|2|| align="center"|– || 86 || 1,492 || 364 || 154 || 688 || 17.3 || 4.2 || 1.8 || 8.0 || align=center|
|-
|align="left"| || align="center"|F/C || align="left"|Stanford || align="center"|3 || align="center"|– || 185 || 3,951 || 1,056 || 625 || 1,339 || 21.4 || 5.7 || 3.4 || 7.2 || align=center|
|-
|align="left"| || align="center"|F/C || align="left"|Notre Dame || align="center"|1 || align="center"| || 30 || 167 || 39 || 19 || 56 || 5.6 || 1.3 || 0.6 || 1.9 || align=center|
|-
|align="left"| || align="center"|G || align="left"|Arizona || align="center"|1 || align="center"| || 26 || 157 || 17 || 24 || 54 || 6.0 || 0.7 || 0.9 || 2.1 || align=center|
|-
|align="left" bgcolor="#FFFF99"|^ || align="center"|G || align="left"|California || align="center"|5 || align="center"|– || 309 || 12,032 || 1,985 || 3,011 || 4,440 || 38.9 || 6.4 || bgcolor="#CFECEC"|9.7 || 14.4 || align=center|
|-
|align="left"| || align="center"|G/F || align="left"|Colorado || align="center"|1 || align="center"| || 1 || 6 || 1 || 0 || 0 || 6.0 || 1.0 || 0.0 || 0.0 || align=center|
|-
|align="left"| || align="center"|C || align="left"|Arkansas || align="center"|5 || align="center"|– || 259 || 3,218 || 731 || 152 || 875 || 12.4 || 2.8 || 0.6 || 3.4 || align=center|
|-
|align="left"| || align="center"|G || align="left"|Kentucky || align="center"|3 || align="center"|– || 117 || 3,357 || 343 || 442 || 1,760 || 28.7 || 2.9 || 3.8 || 15.0 || align=center|
|-
|align="left"| || align="center"|G || align="left"|Stanford || align="center"|1 || align="center"| || 3 || 19 || 3 || 4 || 2 || 6.3 || 1.0 || 1.3 || 0.7 || align=center|
|-
|align="left"| || align="center"|G || align="left"|Dayton || align="center"|4 || align="center"|– || 159 || 2,319 || 181 || 448 || 899 || 14.6 || 1.1 || 2.8 || 5.7 || align=center|
|-
|align="left"| || align="center"|F/C || align="left"|Davidson || align="center"|1 || align="center"| || 8 || 40 || 9 || 0 || 9 || 5.0 || 1.1 || 0.0 || 1.1 || align=center|
|-
|align="left"| || align="center"|F/C || align="left"|San Diego State || align="center"|5 || align="center"|– || 328 || 4,184 || 916 || 343 || 1,257 || 12.8 || 2.8 || 1.0 || 3.8 || align=center|
|-
|align="left"| || align="center"|C || align="left"| BC Kyiv || align="center"|1 || align="center"| || 20 || 59 || 17 || 1 || 20 || 3.0 || 0.9 || 0.1 || 1.0 || align=center|
|-
|align="left"| || align="center"|C || align="left"| Real Madrid Baloncesto || align="center"|2 || align="center"|– || 37 || 343 || 76 || 10 || 140 || 9.3 || 2.1 || 0.3 || 3.8 || align=center|
|-
|align="left"| || align="center"|C || align="left"|Arkansas || align="center"|4 || align="center"|– || 280 || 4,654 || 1,267 || 100 || 1,350 || 16.6 || 4.5 || 0.4 || 4.8 || align=center|
|-
|align="left"| || align="center"|G/F || align="left"|Duke || align="center"|1 || align="center"| || 12 || 53 || 4 || 1 || 11 || 4.4 || 0.3 || 0.1 || 0.9 || align=center|
|-
|align="left"| || align="center"|F || align="left"|Vanderbilt || align="center"|1 || align="center"| || 60 || 541 || 87 || 21 || 183 || 9.0 || 1.5 || 0.4 || 3.1 || align=center|
|-
|align="left"| || align="center"|F/C || align="left"|UTEP || align="center"|1 || align="center"| || 68 || 987 || 323 || 48 || 409 || 14.5 || 4.8 || 0.7 || 6.0 || align=center|
|-
|align="left"| || align="center"|F || align="left"|Georgia Tech || align="center"|1 || align="center"| || 1 || 2 || 0 || 0 || 0 || 2.0 || 0.0 || 0.0 || 0.0 || align=center|
|-
|align="left"| || align="center"|G || align="left"|USC || align="center"|2 || align="center"|– || 145 || 2,839 || 241 || 386 || 1,194 || 19.6 || 1.7 || 2.7 || 8.2 || align=center|
|-
|align="left" bgcolor="#CCFFCC"|x || align="center"|G || align="left"|Brewster Academy (NH) || align="center"|1 || align="center"| || 5 || 32 || 2 || 2 || 10 || 6.4 || 0.4 || 0.4 || 2.0 || align=center|
|-
|align="left"| || align="center"|G || align="left"|Oregon || align="center"|3 || align="center"|– || 207 || 4,725 || 666 || 700 || 2,260 || 22.8 || 3.2 || 3.4 || 10.9 || align=center|
|-
|align="left"| || align="center"|G || align="left"|La Salle || align="center"|1 || align="center"| || 11 || 83 || 8 || 6 || 28 || 7.5 || 0.7 || 0.5 || 2.5 || align=center|
|-
|align="left"| || align="center"|C || align="left"|Maryland || align="center"|5 || align="center"|– || 335 || 6,656 || 2,175 || 259 || 2,421 || 19.9 || 6.5 || 0.8 || 7.2 || align=center|
|-
|align="left"| || align="center"|F || align="left"|Wisconsin || align="center"|1 || align="center"| || 67 || 1,255 || 373 || 72 || 567 || 18.7 || 5.6 || 1.1 || 8.5 || align=center|
|-
|align="left"| || align="center"|G || align="left"|LSU || align="center"|2 || align="center"|– || 80 || 1,103 || 132 || 173 || 393 || 13.8 || 1.7 || 2.2 || 4.9 || align=center|
|-
|align="left"| || align="center"|C || align="left"|Grand Canyon || align="center"|2 || align="center"|– || 28 || 143 || 36 || 5 || 58 || 5.1 || 1.3 || 0.2 || 2.1 || align=center|
|-
|align="left"| || align="center"|F || align="left"|Tennessee || align="center"|1 || align="center"| || 1 || 2 || 0 || 0 || 4 || 2.0 || 0.0 || 0.0 || 4.0 || align=center|
|-
|align="left"| || align="center"|C || align="left"|New Mexico || align="center"|2 || align="center"|– || 111 || 2,350 || 544 || 122 || 791 || 21.2 || 4.9 || 1.1 || 7.1 || align=center|
|-
|align="left"| || align="center"|C || align="left"|Stanford || align="center"|4 || align="center"|– || 242 || 3,486 || 791 || 43 || 1,399 || 14.4 || 3.3 || 0.2 || 5.8 || align=center|
|-
|align="left" bgcolor="#FFCC00"|+ || align="center"|F/C || align="left"|Marquette || align="center"|3 || align="center"|– || 215 || 6,565 || 2,081 || 567 || 3,306 || 30.5 || 9.7 || 2.6 || 15.4 || align=center|
|-
|align="left"| || align="center"|G || align="left"|Miami (OH) || align="center"|1 || align="center"| || 34 || 370 || 23 || 48 || 70 || 10.9 || 0.7 || 1.4 || 2.1 || align=center|
|}

M

|-
|align="left"| || align="center"|F/C || align="left"|Georgia Tech || align="center"|1 || align="center"| || 22 || 69 || 24 || 1 || 32 || 3.1 || 1.1 || 0.0 || 1.5 || align=center|
|-
|align="left"| || align="center"|F || align="left"|UCLA || align="center"|1 || align="center"| || 16 || 143 || 23 || 8 || 42 || 8.9 || 1.4 || 0.5 || 2.6 || align=center|
|-
|align="left"| || align="center"|G || align="left"|Kentucky || align="center"|5 || align="center"|– || 393 || 10,570 || 923 || 1,555 || 4,180 || 26.9 || 2.3 || 4.0 || 10.6 || align=center|
|-
|align="left" bgcolor="#FFCC00"|+ (#9) || align="center"|G/F || align="left"|Central Michigan || align="center"|8 || align="center"|– || 595 || 19,409 || 2,823 || 1,824 || 8,034 || 32.6 || 4.7 || 3.1 || 13.5 || align=center|
|-
|align="left"| || align="center"|F/C || align="left"|Kansas || align="center"|5 || align="center"|– || 276 || 7,438 || 1,499 || 644 || 3,703 || 26.9 || 5.4 || 2.3 || 13.4 || align=center|
|-
|align="left" bgcolor="#FFCC00"|+ || align="center"|G || align="left"|Georgia Tech || align="center"|3 || align="center"|– || 197 || 7,842 || 646 || 1,601 || 4,188 || 39.8 || 3.3 || 8.1 || 21.3 || align=center|
|-
|align="left" bgcolor="#FFCC00"|+ || align="center"|F || align="left"|UNLV || align="center"|9 || align="center"|– || 660 || 24,948 || 6,616 || 1,332 || 12,134 || 37.8 || 10.0 || 2.0 || 18.4 || align=center|
|-
|align="left"| || align="center"|F/C || align="left"|California || align="center"|2 || align="center"|– || 22 || 147 || 39 || 4 || 65 || 6.7 || 1.8 || 0.2 || 3.0 || align=center|
|-
|align="left"| || align="center"|G || align="left"|North Carolina || align="center"|1 || align="center"| || 48 || 702 || 42 || 143 || 143 || 14.6 || 0.9 || 3.0 || 3.0 || align=center|
|-
|align="left"| || align="center"|F || align="left"|Georgetown || align="center"|1 || align="center"| || 10 || 101 || 27 || 6 || 40 || 10.1 || 2.7 || 0.6 || 4.0 || align=center|
|-
|align="left"| || align="center"|F || align="left"|Kentucky || align="center"|1 || align="center"| || 28 || 353 || 61 || 11 || 98 || 12.6 || 2.2 || 0.4 || 3.5 || align=center|
|-
|align="left"| || align="center"|G || align="left"|Tennessee State || align="center"|1 || align="center"| || 36 || 465 || 69 || 60 || 166 || 12.9 || 1.9 || 1.7 || 4.6 || align=center|
|-
|align="left"| || align="center"|G/F || align="left"|Florida State || align="center"|2 || align="center"|– || 111 || 2,458 || 380 || 163 || 884 || 22.1 || 3.4 || 1.5 || 8.0 || align=center|
|-
|align="left"| || align="center"|G || align="left"|Oklahoma || align="center"|1 || align="center"| || 8 || 23 || 4 || 3 || 21 || 2.9 || 0.5 || 0.4 || 2.6 || align=center|
|-
|align="left"| || align="center"|F || align="left"|Wichita State || align="center"|1 || align="center"| || 66 || 2,105 || 476 || 149 || 1,046 || 31.9 || 7.2 || 2.3 || 15.8 || align=center|
|-
|align="left"| || align="center"|F/C || align="left"|Alabama || align="center"|2 || align="center"| || 105 || 2,947 || 751 || 122 || 1,363 || 28.1 || 7.2 || 1.2 || 13.0 || align=center|
|-
|align="left"| || align="center"|G/F || align="left"|Michigan || align="center"|1 || align="center"| || 14 || 280 || 36 || 16 || 102 || 20.0 || 2.6 || 1.1 || 7.3 || align=center|
|-
|align="left"| || align="center"|G/F || align="left"|NYU || align="center"|2 || align="center"|– || 138 || 2,094 || 344 || 175 || 967 || 15.2 || 2.5 || 1.3 || 7.0 || align=center|
|-
|align="left"| || align="center"|F/C || align="left"|Drake || align="center"|1 || align="center"| || 31 || 710 || 168 || 50 || 367 || 22.9 || 5.4 || 1.6 || 11.8 || align=center|
|-
|align="left"| || align="center"|G || align="left"|Marquette || align="center"|1 || align="center"| || 6 || 36 || 3 || 2 || 9 || 6.0 || 0.5 || 0.3 || 1.5 || align=center|
|-
|align="left"| || align="center"|G || align="left"|DePaul || align="center"|1 || align="center"| || 33 || 308 || 48 || 16 || 112 || 9.3 || 1.5 || 0.5 || 3.4 || align=center|
|-
|align="left"| || align="center"|G || align="left"|Tennessee || align="center"|1 || align="center"| || 7 || 82 || 8 || 10 || 37 || 11.7 || 1.1 || 1.4 || 5.3 || align=center|
|-
|align="left"| || align="center"|G || align="left"|Duke || align="center"|2 || align="center"|– || 137 || 2,780 || 329 || 298 || 1,074 || 20.3 || 2.4 || 2.2 || 7.8 || align=center|
|-
|align="left"| || align="center"|G || align="left"|USC || align="center"|1 || align="center"| || 50 || 984 || 134 || 159 || 250 || 19.7 || 2.7 || 3.2 || 5.0 || align=center|
|-
|align="left"| || align="center"|C || align="left"|Iowa State || align="center"|1 || align="center"| || 35 || 449 || 96 || 12 || 188 || 12.8 || 2.7 || 0.3 || 5.4 || align=center|
|-
|align="left"| || align="center"|G/F || align="left"| Olimpija || align="center"|2 || align="center"|– || 44 || 216 || 30 || 14 || 108 || 4.9 || 0.7 || 0.3 || 2.5 || align=center|
|-
|align="left"| || align="center"|C || align="left"|Arkansas || align="center"|3 || align="center"|– || 176 || 3,943 || 1,012 || 430 || 1,272 || 22.4 || 5.8 || 2.4 || 7.2 || align=center|
|-
|align="left"| || align="center"|G/F || align="left"|UAB || align="center"|1 || align="center"| || 2 || 23 || 6 || 1 || 3 || 11.5 || 3.0 || 0.5 || 1.5 || align=center|
|-
|align="left"| || align="center"|F/C || align="left"|Georgetown || align="center"|1 || align="center"| || 20 || 465 || 160 || 50 || 225 || 23.3 || 8.0 || 2.5 || 11.3 || align=center|
|-
|align="left"| || align="center"|G || align="left"|Purdue || align="center"|1 || align="center"| || 27 || 389 || 45 || 40 || 133 || 14.4 || 1.7 || 1.5 || 4.9 || align=center|
|-
|align="left"| || align="center"|F/C || align="left"|UTPA || align="center"|1 || align="center"| || 81 || 1,624 || 540 || 88 || 614 || 20.0 || 6.7 || 1.1 || 7.6 || align=center|
|-
|align="left"| || align="center"|C || align="left"|West Virginia State || align="center"|1 || align="center"| || 5 || 34 || 6 || 0 || 14 || 6.8 || 1.2 || 0.0 || 2.8 || align=center|
|-
|align="left"| || align="center"|F/C || align="left"|Oregon State || align="center"|1 || align="center"| || 1 || 5 || 3 || 0 || 0 || 5.0 || 3.0 || 0.0 || 0.0 || align=center|
|-
|align="left"| || align="center"|F || align="left"|Auburn || align="center"|1 || align="center"| || 44 || 535 || 121 || 23 || 184 || 12.2 || 2.8 || 0.5 || 4.2 || align=center|
|-
|align="left"| || align="center"|F || align="left"|Kansas || align="center"|3 || align="center"|– || 186 || 4,215 || 762 || 236 || 1,772 || 22.7 || 4.1 || 1.3 || 9.5 || align=center|
|-
|align="left"| || align="center"|F || align="left"|Kansas || align="center"|5 || align="center"|– || 345 || 8,715 || 1,860 || 596 || 3,940 || 25.3 || 5.4 || 1.7 || 11.4 || align=center|
|-
|align="left"| || align="center"|G || align="left"|Loyola (MD) || align="center"|1 || align="center"| || 36 || 153 || 20 || 11 || 72 || 4.3 || 0.6 || 0.3 || 2.0 || align=center|
|-
|align="left"| || align="center"|F/C || align="left"|Maryland || align="center"|3 || align="center"|– || 117 || 1,077 || 283 || 63 || 453 || 9.2 || 2.4 || 0.5 || 3.9 || align=center|
|}

N to P

|-
|align="left"| || align="center"|F || align="left"|Iowa State || align="center"|1 || align="center"| || 24 || 355 || 62 || 19 || 160 || 14.8 || 2.6 || 0.8 || 6.7 || align=center|
|-
|align="left" bgcolor="#FFCC00"|+ || align="center"|F/C || align="left"|Clemson || align="center"|7 || align="center"|– || 487 || 15,731 || 3,791 || 1,248 || 8,430 || 32.3 || 7.8 || 2.6 || 17.3 || align=center|
|-
|align="left" bgcolor="#FFFF99"|^ (#13) || align="center"|G || align="left"|Santa Clara || align="center"|10 || align="center"|–– || 744 || 22,781 || 2,293 || bgcolor="#CFECEC"|6,997 || 10,712 || 30.6 || 3.1 || 9.4 || 14.4 || align=center|
|-
|align="left"| || align="center"|F || align="left"|Kansas State || align="center"|3 || align="center"|– || 137 || 1,242 || 317 || 81 || 302 || 9.1 || 2.3 || 0.6 || 2.2 || align=center|
|-
|align="left"| || align="center"|F || align="left"|Cal State Fullerton || align="center"|1 || align="center"| || 44 || 231 || 58 || 15 || 115 || 5.3 || 1.3 || 0.3 || 2.6 || align=center|
|-
|align="left" bgcolor="#CCFFCC"|x || align="center"|G || align="left"| Élan Béarnais || align="center"|2 || align="center"|– || 108 || 1677 || 188 || 242 || 523 || 15.5 || 1.7 || 2.2 || 4.8 || align=center|
|-
|align="left"| || align="center"|G/F || align="left"|Purdue || align="center"|1 || align="center"| || 2 || 11 || 0 || 0 || 3 || 5.5 || 0.0 || 0.0 || 1.5 || align=center|
|-
|align="left"| || align="center"|F/C || align="left"|Eau Claire HS (SC) || align="center"|1 || align="center"| || 55 || 1,029 || 293 || 42 || 454 || 18.7 || 5.3 || 0.8 || 8.3 || align=center|
|-
|align="left" bgcolor="#FFFF99"|^ || align="center"|C || align="left"|LSU || align="center"|2 || align="center"|– || 103 || 3,055 || 929 || 174 || 1,695 || 29.7 || 9.0 || 1.7 || 16.5 || align=center|
|-
|align="left"|x || align="center"|F || align="left"|Kansas || align="center"|1 || align="center"|– || 96 || 3,113 || 557 || 149 || 1,720 || 32.4 || 5.8 || 1.6 || 17.9 || align=center|
|-
|align="left"| || align="center"|F || align="left"|Houston || align="center"|3 || align="center"|– || 192 || 3,782 || 756 || 247 || 749 || 19.7 || 3.9 || 1.3 || 3.9 || align=center|
|-
|align="left"| || align="center"|F || align="left"|Arizona State || align="center"|2 || align="center"|– || 58 || 533 || 52 || 64 || 177 || 9.2 || 0.9 || 1.1 || 3.1 || align=center|
|-
|align="left" bgcolor="#CCFFCC"|x || align="center"|F || align="left"|Texas Tech || align="center"|1 || align="center"| || 3 || 15 || 3 || 0 || 4 || 5.0 || 1.0 || 0.0 || 1.3 || align=center|
|-
|align="left"| || align="center"|G || align="left"|Colorado State || align="center"|1 || align="center"| || 28 || 272 || 23 || 29 || 79 || 9.7 || 0.8 || 1.0 || 2.8 || align=center|
|-
|align="left"| || align="center"|G || align="left"|Fordham || align="center"|1 || align="center"| || 5 || 34 || 3 || 4 || 15 || 6.8 || 0.6 || 0.8 || 3.0 || align=center|
|-
|align="left"bgcolor="#FBCEB1"|* || align="center"|G || align="left"|Wake Forest || align="center"|1 || align="center"| || 70 || 2,199 || 312 || 622 || 1,149 || 31.4 || 4.5 || 8.9 || 16.4 || align=center|
|-
|align="left"| || align="center"|G || align="left"|Murray State || align="center"|2 || align="center"|- || 68 || 1,262 || 175 || 241 || 592 || 18.6 || 2.6 || 3.5 || 8.7 || align=center|
|-
|align="left"| || align="center"|G || align="left"|Louisiana || align="center"|1 || align="center"| || 19 || 551 || 100 || 118 || 224 || 29.0 || 5.3 || 6.2 || 11.8 || align=center|
|-
|align="left"| || align="center"|F || align="left"|Missouri State || align="center"|4 || align="center"|– || 239 || 7,250 || 2,269 || 495 || 2,746 || 30.3 || 9.5 || 2.1 || 11.5 || align=center|
|-
|align="left"| || align="center"|G || align="left"|Memphis || align="center"|4 || align="center"|– || 233 || 4,537 || 368 || 946 || 1,734 || 19.5 || 1.6 || 4.1 || 7.4 || align=center|
|-
|align="left"| || align="center"|F/C || align="left"|Temple || align="center"|4 || align="center"|– || 248 || 4,296 || 961 || 196 || 1,686 || 17.3 || 3.9 || 0.8 || 6.8 || align=center|
|-
|align="left"| || align="center"|G || align="left"|Auburn || align="center"|3 || align="center"|– || 240 || 6,735 || 814 || 366 || 2,939 || 28.1 || 3.4 || 1.5 || 12.2 || align=center|
|-
|align="left"| || align="center"|F || align="left"|Valparaiso || align="center"|1 || align="center"| || 20 || 225 || 37 || 12 || 82 || 11.3 || 1.9 || 0.6 || 4.1 || align=center|
|-
|align="left"| || align="center"|G/F || align="left"|Nebraska || align="center"|2 || align="center"|– || 27 || 186 || 21 || 14 || 66 || 6.9 || 0.8 || 0.5 || 2.4 || align=center|
|-
|align="left"| || align="center"|G/F || align="left"| Élan Béarnais || align="center"|1 || align="center"| || 38 || 689 || 76 || 23 || 283 || 18.1 || 2.0 || 0.6 || 7.4 || align=center|
|-
|align="left"| || align="center"|F || align="left"|Villanova || align="center"|2 || align="center"|– || 160 || 3,852 || 888 || 206 || 1,518 || 24.1 || 5.6 || 1.3 || 9.5 || align=center|
|-
|align="left"| || align="center"|F || align="left"|Maryland || align="center"|4 || align="center"|– || 234 || 3,292 || 718 || 204 || 1,060 || 14.1 || 3.1 || 0.9 || 4.5 || align=center|
|-
|align="left"| || align="center"|F/C || align="left"|Duke || align="center"|2 || align="center"|– || 134 || 2,969 || 900 || 70 || 879 || 22.2 || 6.7 || 0.5 || 6.6 || align=center|
|-
|align="left"| || align="center"|G || align="left"|Missouri || align="center"|1 || align="center"| || 9 || 113 || 8 || 29 || 22 || 12.6 || 0.9 || 3.2 || 2.4 || align=center|
|-
|align="left"| || align="center"|G || align="left"|UConn || align="center"|1 || align="center"| || 5 || 44 || 3 || 6 || 6 || 8.8 || 0.6 || 1.2 || 1.2 || align=center|
|-
|align="left"| || align="center"|G || align="left"|Utah Valley || align="center"|3 || align="center"|– || 112 || 1,862 || 166 || 232 || 476 || 16.6 || 1.5 || 2.1 || 4.3 || align=center|
|}

R to S

|-
|align="left"| || align="center"|F || align="left"|Santa Clara || align="center"|4 || align="center"|– || 153 || 2,778 || 783 || 209 || 641 || 18.2 || 5.1 || 1.4 || 4.2 || align=center|
|-
|align="left"| || align="center"|F || align="left"|Duke || align="center"|2 || align="center"|– || 30 || 196 || 51 || 4 || 37 || 6.5 || 1.7 || 0.1 || 1.2 || align=center|
|-
|align="left"| || align="center"|F || align="left"|Bethel College || align="center"|1 || align="center"| || 7 || 38 || 8 || 1 || 16 || 5.4 || 1.1 || 0.1 || 2.3 || align=center|
|-
|align="left"| || align="center"|G || align="left"|Ohio State || align="center"|1 || align="center"| || 51 || 770 || 77 || 33 || 418 || 15.1 || 1.5 || 0.6 || 8.2 || align=center|
|-
|align="left"| || align="center"|G || align="left"|Miami (FL) || align="center"|1 || align="center"| || 21 || 242 || 39 || 13 || 63 || 11.5 || 1.9 || 0.6 || 3.0 || align=center|
|-
|align="left"| || align="center"|G || align="left"|Texas || align="center"|1 || align="center"| || 2 || 8 || 2 || 0 || 3 || 4.0 || 1.0 || 0.0 || 1.5 || align=center|
|-
|align="left"| || align="center"|G || align="left"|Michigan State || align="center"|1 || align="center"| || 12 || 99 || 13 || 8 || 37 || 8.3 || 1.1 || 0.7 || 3.1 || align=center|
|-
|align="left"| || align="center"|G || align="left"|Michigan State || align="center"|3 || align="center"|– || 162 || 5,200 || 776 || 289 || 2,672 || 32.1 || 4.8 || 1.8 || 16.5 || align=center|
|-
|align="left"| || align="center"|G || align="left"|DePaul || align="center"|1 || align="center"| || 79 || 2,839 || 479 || 158 || 1,176 || 35.9 || 6.1 || 2.0 || 14.9 || align=center|
|-
|align="left" bgcolor="#FFFF99"|^ || align="center"|G/F || align="left"|Kentucky || align="center"|1 || align="center"| || 60 || 790 || 47 || 57 || 278 || 13.2 || 0.8 || 1.0 || 4.6 || align=center|
|-
|align="left"| || align="center"|F/C || align="left"|Kentucky || align="center"|3 || align="center"|– || 111 || 1,533 || 354 || 128 || 524 || 13.8 || 3.2 || 1.2 || 4.7 || align=center|
|-
|align="left"| || align="center"|F/C || align="left"|UConn || align="center"|4 || align="center"|– || 292 || 9,689 || 1,330 || 759 || 4,775 || 33.2 || 4.6 || 2.6 || 16.4 || align=center|
|-
|align="left"| || align="center"|G || align="left"|Michigan || align="center"|1 || align="center"| || 12 || 87 || 7 || 8 || 36 || 7.3 || 0.6 || 0.7 || 3.0 || align=center|
|-
|align="left" bgcolor="#FFCC00"|+ || align="center"|F/C || align="left"|Tennessee State || align="center"|4 || align="center"|– || 264 || 9,299 || 2,505 || 566 || 4,789 || 35.2 || 9.5 || 2.1 || 18.1 || align=center|
|-
|align="left"| || align="center"|F || align="left"|Wake Forest || align="center"|3 || align="center"|– || 214 || 5,723 || 1,047 || 422 || 2,757 || 26.7 || 4.9 || 2.0 || 12.9 || align=center|
|-
|align="left"| || align="center"|G/F || align="left"|Michigan || align="center"|1 || align="center"| || 29 || 246 || 23 || 16 || 108 || 8.5 || 0.8 || 0.6 || 3.7 || align=center|
|-
|align="left"|x || align="center"|G || align="left"| Juventut Badalona || align="center"|1 || align="center"| || 65 || 2,016 || 304 || 570 || 847 || 31.0 || 4.7 || 8.8 || 13.0 || align=center|
|-
|align="left"| || align="center"|G || align="left"|Hawaii || align="center"|1 || align="center"| || 49 || 319 || 23 || 48 || 233 || 6.5 || 0.5 || 1.0 || 4.8 || align=center|
|-
|align="left"| || align="center"|F/C || align="left"| Pallacanestro Varese || align="center"|1 || align="center"| || 7 || 30 || 6 || 3 || 8 || 4.3 || 0.9 || 0.4 || 1.1 || align=center|
|-
|align="left" bgcolor="#CCFFCC"|x || align="center"|F || align="left"| Cibona || align="center"|2 || align="center"|– || 116 || 2,503 || 596 || 188 || 1,141 || 21.6 || 5.1 || 1.6 || 9.8 || align=center|
|-
|align="left"| || align="center"|G/F || align="left"|UCLA || align="center"|5 || align="center"|– || 270 || 4,769 || 798 || 379 || 2,405 || 17.7 || 3.0 || 1.4 || 8.9 || align=center|
|-
|align="left"| || align="center"|C || align="left"|Saint Vincent || align="center"|2 || align="center"|– || 57 || 605 || 109 || 13 || 178 || 10.6 || 1.9 || 0.2 || 3.1 || align=center|
|-
|align="left"| || align="center"|F || align="left"|Syracuse || align="center"|2 || align="center"|– || 86 || 1,205 || 290 || 93 || 480 || 14.0 || 3.4 || 1.1 || 5.6 || align=center|
|-
|align="left"| || align="center"|F/C || align="left"|Syracuse || align="center"|1 || align="center"| || 69 || 823 || 208 || 89 || 303 || 11.9 || 3.0 || 1.3 || 4.4 || align=center|
|-
|align="left"| || align="center"|C || align="left"|Colorado State || align="center"|1 || align="center"| || 39 || 337 || 80 || 38 || 70 || 8.6 || 2.1 || 1.0 || 1.8 || align=center|
|-
|align="left"| || align="center"|F || align="left"| Saski Baskonia || align="center"|1 || align="center"| || 82 || 2,184 || 541 || 182 || 1,048 || 26.6 || 6.6 || 2.2 || 12.8 || align=center|
|-
|align="left"| || align="center"|G/F || align="left"|Oral Roberts || align="center"|8 || align="center"|– || 627 || 10,853 || 1,992 || 847 || 3,088 || 17.3 || 3.2 || 1.4 || 4.9 || align=center|
|-
|align="left" bgcolor="#FFFF99"|^ || align="center"|G/F || align="left"|North Carolina || align="center"|4 || align="center"|– || 208 || 7,834 || 860 || 1,103 || 5,163 || 37.7 || 4.1 || 5.3 || bgcolor="#CFECEC"|24.8 || align=center|
|-
|align="left"| || align="center"|F || align="left"|Georgia Tech || align="center"|1 || align="center"| || 29 || 493 || 50 || 24 || 181 || 17.0 || 1.7 || 0.8 || 6.2 || align=center|
|-
|align="left"| || align="center"|F/C || align="left"|Iowa State || align="center"|1 || align="center"| || 9 || 30 || 2 || 3 || 12 || 3.3 || 0.2 || 0.3 || 1.3 || align=center|
|-
|align="left"| || align="center"|F/C || align="left"|Notre Dame || align="center"|1 || align="center"| || 43 || 930 || 240 || 62 || 487 || 21.6 || 5.6 || 1.4 || 11.3 || align=center|
|-
|align="left" bgcolor="#FFCC00"|+ || align="center"|F/C || align="left"|Creighton || align="center"|3 || align="center"|– || 239 || 8,862 || 2,886 || 804 || 3,360 || 37.1 || 12.1 || 3.4 || 14.1 || align=center|
|-
|align="left"| || align="center"|C || align="left"|Augusta || align="center"|1 || align="center"| || 21 || 101 || 28 || 3 || 45 || 4.8 || 1.3 || 0.1 || 2.1 || align=center|
|-
|align="left"| || align="center"|G || align="left"|Louisville || align="center"|1 || align="center"| || 4 || 25 || 4 || 5 || 11 || 6.3 || 1.0 || 1.3 || 2.8 || align=center|
|-
|align="left"| || align="center"|C || align="left"|Michigan || align="center"|1 || align="center"| || 1 || 2 || 0 || 0 || 0 || 2.0 || 0.0 || 0.0 || 0.0 || align=center|
|-
|align="left"| || align="center"|G || align="left"|Virginia || align="center"|1 || align="center"| || 13 || 122 || 16 || 12 || 34 || 9.4 || 1.2 || 0.9 || 2.6 || align=center|
|-
|align="left"| || align="center"|F || align="left"|Baylor || align="center"|1 || align="center"| || 66 || 844 || 238 || 15 || 219 || 12.8 || 3.6 || 0.2 || 3.3 || align=center|
|-
|align="left"| || align="center"|G || align="left"|Wake Forest || align="center"|1 || align="center"| || 70 || 1,006 || 129 || 179 || 261 || 14.4 || 1.8 || 2.6 || 3.7 || align=center|
|-
|align="left"| || align="center"|F/C || align="left"|Maryland || align="center"|1 || align="center"| || 27 || 156 || 37 || 4 || 53 || 5.8 || 1.4 || 0.1 || 2.0 || align=center|
|-
|align="left"| || align="center"|G || align="left"|Marquette || align="center"|1 || align="center"| || 34 || 528 || 56 || 86 || 189 || 15.5 || 1.6 || 2.5 || 5.6 || align=center|
|-
|align="left"| || align="center"|G/F || align="left"|Davidson || align="center"|2 || align="center"|– || 87 || 2,255 || 343 || 220 || 1,034 || 25.9 || 3.9 || 2.5 || 11.9 || align=center|
|-
|align="left"| || align="center"|G || align="left"|UNLV || align="center"|2 || align="center"|– || 157 || 3,903 || 493 || 453 || 1,789 || 24.9 || 3.1 || 2.9 || 11.4 || align=center|
|-
|align="left"| || align="center"|F || align="left"|Louisville || align="center"|1 || align="center"| || 13 || 147 || 48 || 5 || 54 || 11.3 || 3.7 || 0.4 || 4.2 || align=center|
|-
|align="left"| || align="center"|F || align="left"|Colorado || align="center"|1 || align="center"| || 10 || 35 || 8 || 1 || 22 || 3.5 || 0.8 || 0.1 || 2.2 || align=center|
|-
|align="left" bgcolor="#FFCC00"|+ || align="center"|F/C || align="left"|Cypress Creek HS (FL) || align="center"|8 || align="center"|– || 516 || 17,686 || 4,613 || 677 || 11,035 || 34.3 || 8.9 || 1.3 || 21.4 || align=center|
|-
|align="left"| || align="center"|F || align="left"|Arizona State || align="center"|1 || align="center"| || 25 || 211 || 61 || 13 || 76 || 8.4 || 2.4 || 0.5 || 3.0 || align=center|
|-
|align="left"| || align="center"|G || align="left"|Maryland || align="center"|1 || align="center"| || 33 || 270 || 28 || 30 || 73 || 8.2 || 0.8 || 0.9 || 2.2 || align=center|
|-
|align="left"| || align="center"|F || align="left"|LSU || align="center"|1 || align="center"| || 13 || 121 || 33 || 2 || 39 || 9.3 || 2.5 || 0.2 || 3.0 || align=center|
|-
|align="left"| || align="center"|F || align="left"|Auburn || align="center"|1 || align="center"| || 9 || 51 || 8 || 3 || 24 || 5.7 || 0.9 || 0.3 || 2.7 || align=center|
|}

T

|-
|align="left"| || align="center"|G || align="left"|BYU–Hawaii || align="center"|1 || align="center"| || 4 || 17 || 4 || 3 || 7 || 4.3 || 1.0 || 0.8 || 1.8 || align=center|
|-
|align="left"| || align="center"|G/F || align="left"|UTPA || align="center"|2 || align="center"|– || 67 || 621 || 103 || 58 || 314 || 9.3 || 1.5 || 0.9 || 4.7 || align=center|
|-
|align="left"| || align="center"|F || align="left"| Saski Baskonia || align="center"|1 || align="center"| || 79 || 1,686 || 302 || 89 || 965 || 21.3 || 3.8 || 1.1 || 12.2 || align=center|
|-
|align="left"| || align="center"|G || align="left"|Abraham Lincoln HS (NY) || align="center"|2 || align="center"|– || 106 || 1,690 || 159 || 252 || 643 || 15.9 || 1.5 || 2.4 || 6.1 || align=center|
|-
|align="left"| || align="center"|F/C || align="left"|SMU || align="center"|1 || align="center"| || 78 || 1,751 || 387 || 103 || 665 || 22.4 || 5.0 || 1.3 || 8.5 || align=center|
|-
|align="left"| || align="center"|F || align="left"|Lincoln Memorial || align="center"|1 || align="center"| || 2 || 20 || 6 || 1 || 9 || 10.0 || 3.0 || 0.5 || 4.5 || align=center|
|-
|align="left"| || align="center"|G/F || align="left"|Bradley || align="center"|1 || align="center"| || 49 || 521 || 72 || 36 || 194 || 10.6 || 1.5 || 0.7 || 4.0 || align=center|
|-
|align="left"| || align="center"|G || align="left"|Washington || align="center"|1 || align="center"| || 46 || 1,181 || 109 || 171 || 701 || 25.7 || 2.4 || 3.7 || 15.2 || align=center|
|-
|align="left"| || align="center"|F || align="left"|Marquette || align="center"|1 || align="center"| || 39 || 204 || 43 || 17 || 55 || 5.2 || 1.1 || 0.4 || 1.4 || align=center|
|-
|align="left"| || align="center"|F || align="left"|TCU || align="center"|2 || align="center"|– || 120 || 2,619 || 794 || 81 || 763 || 21.8 || 6.6 || 0.7 || 6.4 || align=center|
|-
|align="left"| || align="center"|F || align="left"|Villanova || align="center"|1 || align="center"| || 26 || 634 || 127 || 18 || 287 || 24.4 || 4.9 || 0.7 || 11.0 || align=center|
|-
|align="left"| || align="center"|G/F || align="left"|Fresno State || align="center"|3 || align="center"|– || 122 || 2,178 || 248 || 201 || 819 || 17.9 || 2.0 || 1.6 || 6.7 || align=center|
|-
|align="left"| || align="center"|G || align="left"|Oklahoma State || align="center"|1 || align="center"| || 13 || 46 || 5 || 3 || 26 || 3.5 || 0.4 || 0.2 || 2.0 || align=center|
|-
|align="left"| || align="center"|G/F || align="left"|UCLA || align="center"|1 || align="center"| || 10 || 43 || 11 || 1 || 28 || 4.3 || 1.1 || 0.1 || 2.8 || align=center|
|-
|align="left"| || align="center"|G || align="left"|LSU || align="center"|1 || align="center"| || 9 || 81 || 13 || 2 || 32 || 9.0 || 1.4 || 0.2 || 3.6 || align=center|
|-
|align="left"| || align="center"|F/C || align="left"|Oklahoma || align="center"|3 || align="center"|– || 181 || 3,206 || 581 || 123 || 1,668 || 17.7 || 3.2 || 0.7 || 9.2 || align=center|
|-
|align="left"| || align="center"|F/C || align="left"|Creighton || align="center"|1 || align="center"| || 24 || 272 || 44 || 10 || 80 || 11.3 || 1.8 || 0.4 || 3.3 || align=center|
|-
|align="left"| || align="center"|G || align="left"|Dayton || align="center"|1 || align="center"| || 10 || 206 || 23 || 26 || 75 || 20.6 || 2.3 || 2.6 || 7.5 || align=center|
|-
|align="left"| || align="center"|C || align="left"| Znicz Pruszków || align="center"|1 || align="center"| || 4 || 10 || 1 || 0 || 0 || 2.5 || 0.3 || 0.0 || 0.0 || align=center|
|-
|align="left"| || align="center"|C || align="left"| AEK Athens || align="center"|3 || align="center"|– || 157 || 3,072 || 738 || 55 || 908 || 19.6 || 4.7 || 0.4 || 5.8 || align=center|
|-
|align="left"| || align="center"|F || align="left"| Benetton Treviso || align="center"|1 || align="center"| || 12 || 86 || 20 || 3 || 33 || 7.2 || 1.7 || 0.3 || 2.8 || align=center|
|-
|align="left"| || align="center"|F || align="left"|Wisconsin || align="center"|3 || align="center"|– || 47 || 401 || 46 || 15 || 203 || 8.5 || 1.0 || 0.3 || 4.3 || align=center|
|-
|align="left"| || align="center"|F || align="left"|Texas || align="center"|5 || align="center"|– || 377 || 10,950 || 2,235 || 622 || 3,032 || 29.0 || 5.9 || 1.6 || 8.0 || align=center|
|-
|align="left"| || align="center"|F || align="left"| Anadolu Efes || align="center"|1 || align="center"| || 25 || 630 || 100 || 58 || 237 || 25.2 || 4.0 || 2.3 || 9.5 || align=center|
|}

U to Z

|-
|align="left"| || align="center"|G || align="left"|Kentucky || align="center"|2 || align="center"|– || 132 || 2,781 || 223 || 537 || 998 || 21.1 || 1.7 || 4.1 || 7.6 || align=center|
|-
|align="left" bgcolor="#FFCC00"|+ (#5) || align="center"|G/F || align="left"|Indiana || align="center"|9 || align="center"|– || 685 || 24,242 || 2,452 || 2,396 || 12,060 || 35.4 || 3.6 || 3.5 || 17.6 || align=center|
|-
|align="left"| || align="center"|G/F || align="left"|Indiana || align="center"|1 || align="center"| || 77 || 1,425 || 184 || 67 || 444 || 18.5 || 2.4 || 0.9 || 5.8 || align=center|
|-
|align="left"| || align="center"|C || align="left"|Santa Clara || align="center"|2 || align="center"|– || 68 || 842 || 240 || 59 || 222 || 12.4 || 3.5 || 0.9 || 3.3 || align=center|
|-
|align="left"| || align="center"|C || align="left"|UConn || align="center"|4 || align="center"|– || 228 || 3,813 || 910 || 128 || 1,062 || 16.7 || 4.0 || 0.6 || 4.7 || align=center|
|-
|align="left"| || align="center"|F/C || align="left"|Iowa State || align="center"|1 || align="center"| || 10 || 57 || 13 || 7 || 16 || 5.7 || 1.3 || 0.7 || 1.6 || align=center|
|-
|align="left"| || align="center"|C || align="left"|Florida || align="center"|5 || align="center"|– || 408 || 11,232 || 3,637 || 966 || 6,010 || 27.5 || 8.9 || 2.4 || 14.7 || align=center|
|-
|align="left"| || align="center"|F || align="left"|Syracuse || align="center"|1 || align="center"| || 46 || 490 || 85 || 29 || 231 || 10.7 || 1.8 || 0.6 || 5.0 || align=center|
|-
|align="left"| || align="center"|G/F || align="left"|Pepperdine || align="center"|1 || align="center"| || 63 || 975 || 151 || 131 || 507 || 15.5 || 2.4 || 2.1 || 8.0 || align=center|
|-
|align="left"| || align="center"|F || align="left"|NC State || align="center"|5 || align="center"|– || 261 || 7,234 || 1,078 || 293 || 3,754 || 27.7 || 4.1 || 1.1 || 14.4 || align=center|
|-
|align="left"| || align="center"|F || align="left"|Syracuse || align="center"|2 || align="center"|– || 115 || 1,919 || 388 || 99 || 894 || 16.7 || 3.4 || 0.9 || 7.8 || align=center|
|-
|align="left"| || align="center"|G || align="left"|Kansas State || align="center"|1 || align="center"| || 27 || 129 || 17 || 16 || 67 || 4.8 || 0.6 || 0.6 || 2.5 || align=center|
|-
|align="left"| || align="center"|G/F || align="left"|Arkansas || align="center"|1 || align="center"| || 36 || 421 || 41 || 47 || 90 || 11.7 || 1.1 || 1.3 || 2.5 || align=center|
|-
|align="left"| || align="center"|C || align="left"|Kansas || align="center"|1 || align="center"| || 45 || 364 || 113 || 24 || 144 || 8.1 || 2.5 || 0.5 || 3.2 || align=center|
|-
|align="left"| || align="center"|F/C || align="left"|Old Dominion || align="center"|8 || align="center"|– || 543 || 11,647 || 3,241 || 231 || 3,761 || 21.4 || 6.0 || 0.4 || 6.9 || align=center|
|-
|align="left" bgcolor="#FFFF99"|^ (#44) || align="center"|G || align="left"|USC || align="center"|6 || align="center"|– || 465 || 14,212 || 1,002 || 2,429 || 9,564 || 30.6 || 2.2 || 5.2 || 20.6 || align=center|
|-
|align="left"| || align="center"|G/F || align="left"|Virginia Tech || align="center"|3 || align="center"|– || 158 || 1,759 || 256 || 189 || 481 || 11.1 || 1.6 || 1.2 || 3.0 || align=center|
|-
|align="left"| || align="center"|F/C || align="left"|Georgetown || align="center"|1 || align="center"| || 61 || 861 || 261 || 7 || 261 || 14.1 || 4.3 || 0.1 || 4.3 || align=center|
|-
|align="left"| || align="center"|F || align="left"|South Alabama || align="center"|2 || align="center"|– || 87 || 934 || 167 || 44 || 486 || 10.7 || 1.9 || 0.5 || 5.6 || align=center|
|-
|align="left"| || align="center"|F/C || align="left"|UC Santa Barbara || align="center"|3 || align="center"|– || 62 || 846 || 352 || 36 || 395 || 13.6 || 5.7 || 0.6 || 6.4 || align=center|
|-
|align="left"| || align="center"|F/C || align="left"|Winston-Salem State || align="center"|1 || align="center"| || 79 || 1,040 || 456 || 95 || 371 || 13.2 || 5.8 || 1.2 || 4.7 || align=center|
|-
|align="left"| || align="center"|F/C || align="left"|Tulane || align="center"|3 || align="center"|– || 201 || 5,122 || 1,246 || 211 || 1,251 || 25.5 || 6.2 || 1.0 || 6.2 || align=center|
|-
|align="left"| || align="center"|G || align="left"|Baylor || align="center"|1 || align="center"| || 6 || 26 || 1 || 4 || 5 || 4.3 || 0.2 || 0.7 || 0.8 || align=center|
|-
|align="left"| || align="center"|F/C || align="left"|North Carolina || align="center"|2 || align="center"|– || 85 || 1,139 || 265 || 28 || 390 || 13.4 || 3.1 || 0.3 || 4.6 || align=center|
|-
|align="left"| || align="center"|C || align="left"|Cincinnati || align="center"|1 || align="center"| || 41 || 1,294 || 505 || 76 || 475 || 31.6 || bgcolor="#CFECEC"|12.3 || 1.9 || 11.6 || align=center|
|-
|align="left"| || align="center"|F || align="left"|Nevada || align="center"|1 || align="center"| || 4 || 34 || 5 || 2 || 4 || 8.5 || 1.3 || 0.5 || 1.0 || align=center|
|-
|align="left"| || align="center"|F/C || align="left"|North Carolina || align="center"|1 || align="center"| || 40 || 858 || 194 || 23 || 280 || 21.5 || 4.9 || 0.6 || 7.0 || align=center|
|-
|align="left"| || align="center"|G/F || align="left"|Houston || align="center"|1 || align="center"| || 2 || 11 || 2 || 0 || 4 || 5.5 || 1.0 || 0.0 || 2.0 || align=center|
|-
|align="left"| || align="center"|C || align="left"|Notre Dame || align="center"|1 || align="center"| || 16 || 58 || 10 || 3 || 19 || 3.6 || 0.6 || 0.2 || 1.2 || align=center|
|}

See also
 Phoenix Suns roster
 Phoenix Suns current roster
 Phoenix Suns all-time roster organized by jersey number

References

External links
Phoenix Suns all-time roster
Suns all-time roster
Suns all-time photo roster

National Basketball Association all-time rosters
 
roster